Joseph P. Hunt Farm is a historic tobacco farm complex and national historic district located near Dexter, Granville County, North Carolina.  The farmhouse was built about 1844, and is a two-story, three bay, Greek Revival style dwelling.  It has a two-story rear ell dated to the 1870s and a full-width front porch added in the 1920s.  Also on the property are the contributing small frame outbuilding, potato house, corn crib, two tobacco barns, smokehouse, large horse barn, packhouse, and combination icehouse/carriage house.  Also on the property is the site of Breedlove Mill.

It was listed on the National Register of Historic Places in 1988.

References

Tobacco buildings in the United States
Farms on the National Register of Historic Places in North Carolina
Historic districts on the National Register of Historic Places in North Carolina
Greek Revival houses in North Carolina
Houses completed in 1844
Houses in Granville County, North Carolina
National Register of Historic Places in Granville County, North Carolina